Bion-M No.1 (Бион-М) was a Russian space mission, part of the Bion-M programme focused on space medicine. The new generation Bion-M continued the Soviet/Russian Bion satellite programme aimed at biological research in space. The last spacecraft of the Bion series, Bion 11, was launched in 1996. The Bion-M1 spacecraft was designed to carry biological, physiological and biotechnological experiments to low Earth orbit and return them to Earth at the end of the mission. The biological payload for Bion-M1 included rodents, amphibians, reptiles, crustaceans, mollusks, fish, insects, bacteria, plant and animal cell cultures. The spacecraft was the result of collaboration hosting biomedical payloads provided by scientific institutions from the United States, Germany, Canada, the Netherlands, Poland and other countries. The Bion-M automated spacecraft was a unique specialized space complex that aimed to determine the fundamental mechanisms of how life adapts to microgravity and then readapts to Earth-normal gravity.

Launch  and return 
The animal-carrying space capsule was launched into orbit on 19 April 2013, from Baikonur Cosmodrome, Kazakhstan. The Bion-M flew a 30-day mission.
 The satellite was launched in a ride-share along with 6 small satellites - OSSI-1, Dove-2, AIST 2, BEESat 3, SOMP and BEESat 2.

Return to Earth was on 19 May 2013 with a landing near Orenburg in Russia at 03:12 UTC.

Satellite description 
The satellite had components from two long-standing Soviet spy satellite families. Bion's landing unit was from the Zenit 2M satellite and the satellite also carried an instrument section developed for the Yantar satellite. The satellite was made by TsSKB Progress of Samara, Russia.

The cargo consisted of 45 mice (three per cage), 15 geckos, eight Mongolian gerbils, snails, and fish. The animals were intended to survive the entire mission, but upon landing it was found that all gerbils, most of the 45 mice, and all of the fish were dead due to equipment failure. Fifteen of the mice died when the food dispenser in their experimental compartment stopped working. The gerbil compartment suffered a temporary loss of power, ventilation, lighting, and food supply that likely accounts for their demise. Ultimately, all of the remaining animals were  euthanized for study. The Bion-M No.1 mission was managed by Roscosmos, but scientists from the United States, Germany, Canada, Poland, the Netherlands and other countries also participated in the experiments.

Research 

Research on the recovered animals revealed insights into the impact of spaceflight on cerebral arteries, the spinal cord, inner ear, and genetic processes. Deputy Director of Russia's Institute of Medical and Biological Studies Vladimir Sychev indicated that some of the results may help explain why some astronauts suffer impaired vision during spaceflight: "We used to think that in zero-gravity, fluid travelled upward and that the quality of blood improved, but it turns out that it is the other way around. The arteries of the brain come under duress and their capacity is reduced by 40 percent." The reduced bloodflow may be key to triggering orthostatic intolerance.

See also 

 2013 in spaceflight
 Effect of spaceflight on the human body
 Space medicine

References 

Bion satellites
Spacecraft launched in 2013
2013 in spaceflight
2013 in Russia
Spacecraft launched by Soyuz-2 rockets